John Eugene Zuccotti (June 23, 1937 – November 19, 2015) was an Italian-American businessman active in real estate and development in New York City. He is best known as the namesake of Zuccotti Park.

Early life
John Zuccotti was born in 1937 to Angelo and Gemma Zuccotti. He had one brother, Andrew. His father was an Italian immigrant to the United States who had become well known in New York's high society as the longtime maitre d' of El Morocco, a nightclub frequented by the rich and famous.

Zuccotti graduated in 1959 from Princeton University with a bachelor's degree. He earned a JD degree from Yale Law School in 1963.

Career
Zuccotti served in a number of governmental and civic positions including member of the New York City Planning Commission starting in 1971, of which he became chairman in 1973.  In mid-November 1975, he was named first deputy mayor of the city by Mayor Abraham D. Beame, serving until 1977 Zuccotti practiced law from 1977 until 1990.

Zuccotti served as assistant to the secretary of Housing and Urban Development and as chairman of the Real Estate Board of New York.  He was also a member of the boards of groups as diverse as World Trade Center Memorial Foundation and the Visiting Nurse Service of New York.

As a businessman, Zuccotti was active in the development of New York City, as a partner in a number of real estate firms including Olympia & York, and law firms such as Brown & Wood, Tufo & Zuccotti, and Weil, Gotshal & Manges, and as the U.S. chairman of Brookfield Properties.

Politically, Zuccotti was active in both Democratic and Republican politics on both the local and national level, serving at various times on the National Republican Congressional Committee and Joe Biden's presidential campaign.

Zuccotti was married to Susan Sessions Zuccotti, the author of a number of books relating to the Holocaust. He died of a heart attack on November 19, 2015. aged 78.

References

External links 

 The John Zuccotti Papers at the New-York Historical Society

1937 births
2015 deaths
American people of Italian descent
Princeton University alumni
Yale Law School alumni
American real estate businesspeople
Deputy mayors of New York City
20th-century American lawyers